Michael May (born 18 August 1934 in Stuttgart, Germany) is a former racing driver and engineer from Switzerland. He participated in three Formula One World Championship Grands Prix, debuting on 14 May 1961. He scored no championship points.

After a crash during practice for the 1961 German Grand Prix, May concentrated on engineering, helping to develop a fuel injection system for Porsche and Ferrari.

May is generally credited with introducing the first manipulated elevated wing onto a racing car - a Porsche 550 - to produce downforce (or down thrust) for enhanced braking and cornering speeds to reduce lap times.

He also worked in designing high-compression engines, improving fuel economy among other things. The most notable example was his reworked 'Fireball' head for the 'high-efficiency' high-compression Jaguar V-12 HE engine.

Complete Formula One World Championship results
(key)

Non-Championship
(key)

Notes
 Sources disagree as to the spelling of May's first name. Forix and The Guinness Complete Grand Prix Who's Who say "Michael", whereas  www.grandprix.com says "Michel" and this 8W article lists both. However, this source offers evidence that it's "Michael".

References

1934 births
Living people
Swiss racing drivers
Swiss Formula One drivers
Ferrari people
Swiss motorsport people